The yellow-thighed brushfinch (Atlapetes tibialis) is a passerine bird which is endemic to the highlands of  Costa Rica and western Panama. Despite its name, it is not a true finch, but rather a member of the family Passerellidae, which also includes American sparrows,  juncos and towhees.

This is a common bird in wet mountain forests, second growth, bamboo clumps, scrubby pasture and bushy clearings from 1700 m altitude to the timberline. When not breeding, it can descend to 1200 m on the Caribbean slopes.

The nest, built by the female, is a bulky cup of plant material hidden in coarse grasses, bamboo or a thickly-foliaged tree 0.7-4.6 m above the ground. The female lays two brown-blotched white or pale blue eggs, which she incubates for 12–14 days.

The yellow-thighed brushfinch is a long-tailed species, 18.5 cm long and weighing 31 g. The adult is mainly dark grey, becoming black on the crown, throat, wings and tail, and with an olive tinge to the belly and breast.  The bright yellow thighs contrast with the otherwise drab plumage, and give this species its English and scientific names. Young birds have duller, sootier plumage with a brown tone to the underparts, and olive-brown thighs.

The yellow-thighed brushfinch has a heavy metallic tchuk call, and pairs have a twittering tinkling greeting. The male's song consists of high dry notes, tee tididee dee wink wink,  or similar phrases.

The yellow-thighed brushfinch feeds at all levels from the treetops to the ground, taking insects and spiders and many berries. It will also squeeze nectar from flowers. It is seen in pairs, family groups or in mixed-species feeding flocks with other small birds such as warblers. It can be very approachable.

References

 Stiles and Skutch,  A Guide to the Birds of Costa Rica, 

yellow-thighed brushfinch
Birds of Costa Rica
yellow-thighed brushfinch
Taxobox binomials not recognized by IUCN